The pale flycatcher (Melaenornis pallidus) is a passerine bird of the Old World flycatcher family Muscicapidae, found in Sub-Saharan Africa.

Taxonomy
The pale flycatcher was previously placed in the genus Bradornis but was moved to Melaenornis based on the results of a molecular phylogenetic study published in 2010. Some taxonomists place it in the genus Agricola instead.

Range 
It is found in Angola, Benin, Botswana, Burkina Faso, Burundi, Cameroon, Central African Republic, Chad, Republic of the Congo, Democratic Republic of the Congo, Ivory Coast, Eritrea, Eswatini, Ethiopia, Gabon, Gambia, Ghana, Guinea, Guinea-Bissau, Kenya, Malawi, Mali, Mauritania, Mozambique, Namibia, Niger, Nigeria, Rwanda, Senegal, Sierra Leone, Somalia, South Africa, Sudan, Tanzania, Togo, Uganda, Zambia, and Zimbabwe.

Habitat 
Its natural habitats are subtropical or tropical dry forests, dry savanna, and subtropical or tropical dry shrubland.

References

External links
 Pale flycatcher - Species text in The Atlas of Southern African Birds.

pale flycatcher
Birds of Sub-Saharan Africa
pale flycatcher
pale flycatcher
Taxonomy articles created by Polbot
Taxobox binomials not recognized by IUCN